Marquess of Portago is a hereditary title in the Peerage of Spain accompanied by the dignity of Grandee, granted in 1744 by Philip V to José Gómez de Terán y Delgado, Finance Treasurer and Council Minister of Spain.

Marquesses of Portago (1744)

 José Gómez de Terán y Delgado, 1st Marquess of Portago (1686-1754)
 Francisco de Paula Gómez de Terán y García de La Madrid, 2nd Marquess of Portago (1730-1793), eldest son of the 1st Marquess
 José Gómez de Terán y Negrete, 3rd Marquess of Portago (d. 1801), eldest son of the 2nd Marquess
 Francisco Gómez de Terán y Negrete, 4th Marquess of Portago (1762-1816), second son of the 2nd Marquess
 Francisca Gómez de Terán y Negrete, 5th Marchioness of Portago (b. 1760), eldest daughter of the 2nd Marquess
 Vicente Cabeza de Vaca y Gómez de Terán, 6th Marquess of Portago (d. 1853), eldest son of the 5th Marchioness
 José Manuel Cabeza de Vaca y Morales, 7th Marquess of Portago (1819-1878), eldest son of the 6th Marquess
 Mariano Cabeza de Vaca y Morales, 8th Marquess of Portago (1821-1887), second son of the 6th Marquess
 Vicente Cabeza de Vaca y Fernández de Córdoba, 9th Marquess of Portago (1865-1921), eldest son of the 8th Marquess
 Antonio Cabeza de Vaca y Carvajal, 10th Marquess of Portago (1892-1941), eldest son of the 9th Marquess
 Alfonso Cabeza de Vaca y Leighton, 11th Marquess of Portago (1928-1957), eldest son of the 10th Marquess
 Antonio Alfonso Cabeza de Vaca y McDaniel, 12th Marquess of Portago (1954-1990), eldest son of the 11th Marquess
 Andrea Cabeza de Vaca y McDaniel, 13th Marchioness of Portago (b. 1951), eldest daughter of the 11th Marquess
 Theodora Cabeza de Vaca y Spier, 14th Marchioness of Portago (b. 1985), eldest daughter of the 12th Marquess

See also
List of current Grandees of Spain
Count of la Mejorada

References

Bibliography
 

Grandees of Spain
Marquesses of Spain
Lists of Spanish nobility
Noble titles created in 1744